Meng Xiang, nicknamed Pit, is a male giant panda. Born in the Berlin Zoo on August 31, 2019, Meng Xiang and his twin Meng Yuan were the first giant pandas born in Germany. Their father Jiao Qing and mother Meng Meng were both from Sichuan, and arrived in Berlin for 75th anniversary of diplomatic relations between China and Germany in 2017.

The naming of the twin panda cubs raised a lot of concerns. Joshua Wong suggested that they should be named "Democracy" and "Freedom", while the people of Berlin suggested the names "Hong Hong" and "Kong Kong". Some people suggested the names "Hotdog" and "Fries". However, they were finally named "Meng Xiang" and "Meng Yuan". The name Meng Xiang (梦想) means long awaited dream.

See also
 Meng Yuan

References

2019 animal births
Individual giant pandas
Individual animals in Germany